Dublin Design  Institute (DDI)is the longest-established specialised design private third level (higher education) college in Ireland.

About Dublin Design Institute
Established in 1991, Dublin Design Institute (DDI), formerly known as the Dublin Institute of Design, was founded in 1991. Since its inception the Institute has grown to a student population of approximately 300 undergraduates studying in four specialised fields of design: Interior, Graphic, Web and Fashion Design.

The Institutes's Dublin city centre campus is adjacent to Grafton Street, and St Stephens Green, and is located directly across from the National Library of Ireland.

Dublin Design Institute runs full and part-time degree and higher education qualifications in Interior Design, Graphic Design, Web Design, Fashion Design and shorter accredited programmes in Computer Aided Design, Visual Merchandising, Fashion Design, Personal Image & Styling, Graphic Design, Web Design, Interior Design, App Design, Product Design, and Digital Photography.

Student Awards

2015
The Graphic Design Award by Yamaha (GDAY) is a global award that looks for new designs of marques, symbols, and pictograms that promote the theme of Kando. It was won by 3rd Year Full Time Graphic Design Degree Student Laurie Concannon in 2015, who received the first prize of $10,000 [US].

The 2015 Frankfurt Style Awards announced its shortlist for the catwalk show in April 2015. Siu-Hong Mok from 1st Year Full Time Fashion Design was selected to exhibit his garment "Less is More" in the Ecological Green catwalk show, one of two Irish representatives.

2014
The 2014 Dublin Fashion Festival announced the 12 finalists for their catwalk show in August 2014. Marian Witcher and Suzanne Stroker from Dublin Design Institute were included in the shortlist.

On 13 October 2014, TV3 announced a rival to RTÉ One's The Late Late Toy Show which broadcast live from the RDS on 21 November 2014. TV3 commissioned Dublin Design's Institutes fashion design students to create a dress from loom bands. The result was a dress inspired by Disney's Frozen (2013 film).

References

Further education colleges in Dublin (city)